Duros can refer to:

 Duros (Star Wars), an alien race in the Star Wars franchise.
 Duros (food), a crisp Mexican snack made of hardened wheat flour that has been deep fried.
 DUROS, a drug delivery platform

See also
 Duro (disambiguation)